Kostas Skandalidis (born 11 January 1953) is a Greek politician and member of the Greek Parliament for the Panhellenic Socialist Movement (PASOK) for the Athens A constituency.

Life
M.P. Kostas Skandalidis was born in 1953 in Kos, Greece. He is the son of the priest, Papa-Giorgis and Christina Skandalidi. He graduated from the National Technical University of Athens with a degree in electrical engineering. In 1974 he became a founding member of the PA.SO.K., and has since then elected as a member of the Hellenic Parliament in all general elections since 1989, initially for the Dodecanese and from 2000 in the Athens A constituency.

He was elected secretary of the Central Committee of the PA.SO.K. three times between 11 October 1995 and 22 October 2001.

M.P. Kostas Skandalidis was a candidate for the position of Mayor of Athens in the local elections of 2006, in which he received 28.84% and his platform became the major opposition.

After the legislative elections of 2007, in which the PA.SO.K. was defeated, M.P. Kostas Skandalidis announced his candidacy for the leadership of the party. In the leadership elections, which took place on 11 November 2007, he was placed third with 5.74% of the vote, behind incumbent party leader George Papandreou and Evangelos Venizelos.

He has held the following posts:

Minister for the Aegean and Island Policy (13 October 1993 - 8 July 1994)
Minister of Interior (8 July 1994 - 15 September 1995)
Minister for the Interior and Public Order (24 October 2001 - 10 March 2004)
Minister for Rural Development and Food (since 9 September 2010)

See also
 PA.SO.K.
 Cabinet of Greece

References

 Biography of M.P. Kostas Skandalidis in the Official Website of the Hellenic Parliament

External links 
  
 

1953 births
Living people
National Technical University of Athens alumni
Greek MPs 1989 (June–November)
Greek MPs 1989–1990
Greek MPs 1990–1993
Greek MPs 1993–1996
Greek MPs 1996–2000
Greek MPs 2000–2004
Greek MPs 2004–2007
Greek MPs 2007–2009
PASOK politicians
Greek MPs 2009–2012
Ministers of the Interior of Greece
Greek MPs 2012 (May)
Greek MPs 2012–2014
Greek MPs 2015 (February–August)
People from Kos
Greek MPs 2015–2019
Greek MPs 2019–2023